NFL Xtreme is an American football video game released for the Sony PlayStation in 1998. The game was produced by 989 Studios and published by Sony Computer Entertainment as a competitor to Midway Games' NFL Blitz series. The gameplay is similar to the style of NFL Blitz, but is more of a casual gamer / arcade version of NFL Gameday '98, like NFL Tour ('08, the "next gen" NFL Street) and Madden NFL 08 respectively.

Gameplay
Unlike real football, each game is a five-on-five matchup and every player is an eligible receiver. In addition, there are no boundaries or penalties, and a first down is 20 yards.

The game also offers standard football video game features such as create-a-player, draft picks, and season play, and includes full NFL licensing with real NFL teams and schedules.

Development
NFL Xtreme was built on the same game engine as NFL Gameday '98. However, because the game uses a much smaller number of players - five on each side - the developers were able to use more polygons in each player without taxing the hardware, allowing more detailed players.

Reception

The game received "mixed" reviews according to the review aggregation website GameRankings. Next Generation said that the game was "no NFL Blitz. NFL Mel-O would have been a more apt title." GameFan gave the game universal acclaim, over a month before it was released Stateside.

Sequel
A sequel to NFL Xtreme came out, and the series was discontinued shortly thereafter. Mike Alstott (Tampa Bay Buccaneers) appeared on the cover of NFL Xtreme.  John Randle was the cover athlete for the second game in the franchise, NFL Xtreme 2.

Film director Oren Peli, best known for his sleeper hit Paranormal Activity, was a programmer for NFL Xtreme.

References

External links
 

1998 video games
National Football League video games
PlayStation (console) games
PlayStation (console)-only games
Sony Interactive Entertainment franchises
Video games developed in the United States